The 2011–12 season was FC Barcelona's 112th in existence and the club's 81st consecutive season in the top flight of Spanish football. Barcelona debuted their new and first paid shirt sponsor Qatar Foundation after an agreement was reached in 2010 with the non-profit organization for a five-and-a-half-year, €170 million deal. The agreement with UNICEF continued and their name had been moved to the lower back portion of the shirt.
This season also introduced a new away kit in black while the third kit was retained from last season.

Barcelona was unsuccessful in defending two major trophies. They ended the La Liga season as runners-up, nine points behind winners Real Madrid, who finished with a record 100 points having clinched the league title by defeating Athletic Bilbao 3–0 on 2 May 2012. Barcelona's UEFA Champions League campaign ended in the semi-finals after a 2–3 aggregate loss against eventual winners Chelsea. Pep Guardiola stepped down as manager at the conclusion of the season, which ended on a high as Barcelona won 3–0 in the Copa del Rey final against Athletic Bilbao at the Vicente Calderón.

Barcelona's under-19 squad played in the inaugural tournament of the NextGen series. After finishing first in their group during the group stage, they were eliminated by Ajax in the quarter-finals of the tournament.

Season overview

May/June
On 31 May, Sevilla confirmed it had exercised its right to purchase defender Martín Cáceres, who spent the 2010–11 season on loan with the club from Barcelona. Barcelona received €4.10 million in compensation after making the loan permanent.

July
On 2 July, Barcelona parted ways with midfielder Víctor Sánchez after both parties agreed to rescind the player's contract. Sánchez made 14 appearances with the first team in the 2007–2008 and 2008–2009 seasons. He was loaned to Xerez for the 2009–10 season and at Getafe for the 2010–11 season.

On 4 July, defender Andreu Fontàs was promoted to the first team after spending the previous season filling in for an injured Eric Abidal, who had been diagnosed with a liver tumour.

On 21 July, Barcelona completed the transfer of Chilean winger Alexis Sánchez from Italian club Udinese. The deal is for five years and the cost of the transfer is €26 million with variable cost of €11.5 million.

On 22 July, Barcelona transferred La Masia graduate Bojan to Italian outfit Roma for €10 million and the agreement includes an obligatory re-purchase clause to be exercised by Barcelona at the end of the 2012–13 season, for a cost of €13 million. Roma may override this re-purchase at this time by paying the club an additional €28 million.

August
On 3 August, Portuguese club Sporting CP made official the signing of another Barcelona's La Masia graduate, winger Jeffrén, on a five-year deal. The transfer deal was worth €3.7 million and includes a €30 million buyout clause.

On 4 August, Barcelona and Argentine centre-back Gabriel Milito reached an agreement to terminate his contract after four years with the team. He then signed with Argentine club Independiente.

On 14 August, both Barcelona and English club Arsenal announced on their respective official websites an agreement for the transfer of Spanish international midfielder Cesc Fàbregas. The deal will cost Barcelona €29 million with €11 million in variables and end one of the longest transfer sagas in football. On the same day, Barcelona and Real Madrid kicked off the 2011–12 season with a 2–2 draw at the Santiago Bernabéu in the first leg of the 2011 Supercopa de España in front of a full house.

On 17 August, Barcelona won the Supercopa de España with a thrilling 3–2 win and a 5–4 aggregate over rivals Real Madrid. The match ended with several sending offs for a brawl started after Barcelona players deemed a tackle by Marcelo on Cesc Fàbregas to be dangerous play. David Villa, Mesut Özil and Marcelo all received their marching orders after calm was restored. Real Madrid manager José Mourinho and Barça's assistant Tito Vilanova were also involved in a small physical altercation. Goals from Andrés Iniesta and a brace, including the game winner, by Lionel Messi assured Barça started their season with a trophy by claiming their tenth Supercopa all time.

On 19 August, the Association of Spanish Footballers (AFE) went on strike due to unpaid wages for players in the top two divisions of Spanish football by clubs who have gone into financial administration. The AFE and Liga de Fútbol Profesional (LFP) have yet to agree on a guaranteed fund to protect players' wages in the event of their clubs being declared insolvent. The strike forced Spanish league games scheduled for the weekend of 20 and 21 August, including Barcelona's season opener against Málaga, to be postponed.

On 25 August, Lionel Messi was voted the winner of the inaugural UEFA Best Player in Europe Award for the 2010–11 season over teammate Xavi and Real Madrid's Cristiano Ronaldo.

On 26 August, Barcelona won the UEFA Super Cup with a 2–0 victory over Portuguese outfit Porto in Monaco. The victory gave Barça their fourth UEFA Super Cup trophy all time and saw Fàbregas score his first goal with a Barcelona shirt in the 88th minute.

September
On 10 September, back from the FIFA international break, Barcelona could only draw 2–2 with Real Sociedad at Anoeta. Barça also lost Alexis Sánchez for approximately 6–8 weeks after the player tore his hamstring in his right leg after a tackle by Sociedad's Dani Estrada.

On 13 September, Barcelona opened their UEFA Champions League campaign with a 2–2 draw against Milan at the Camp Nou. Midfielder Andrés Iniesta left in the 38th minute with a tore femoral biceps on his left leg and will miss approximately a month.

On 17 September, after two consecutive draws Barcelona trashed Osasuna 8–0 at Camp Nou. Lionel Messi scored a hat-trick and lead Barça to their biggest win of the season. Osasuna coach José Luis Mendilibar stated, "we've caught them very angry due to their so-called mini-crisis," while Barça's coach Pep Guardiola stated in regards to the mini-crisis, "the day I see them not running, that their bellies are full, I'll sit here to tell you all [media]. When we play bad, believe me I'll come here and tell you all. But I did not have that sensation."

On 28 September, Barcelona defeated BATE Borisov 0–5 at the Dynama Stadium in their first meeting in Group H of the Champions League. Lionel Messi scored a brace and tied László Kubala for 2nd place on the all-time goals scoring list for Barcelona with 194 goals.

October
On 2 October, Barcelona defeated Sporting de Gijón 0–1 at El Molinón to take over first place in La Liga's standings for the first time this season. A lone goal by Adriano was enough to see the team go top by goal difference over Levante.

On 19 October, Barcelona notched its second Champions League victory of the season by defeating Czech side Viktoria Plzeň 2–0 at the Camp Nou.

On 22 October, Barça were held scoreless for the first time in the young season by a heroic performance from Sevilla goalkeeper Javi Varas. The match ended with a scoreless draw after Lionel Messi's penalty kick was saved by Varas in injury time. The match towards the end was marred by a small brawl between Frédéric Kanouté and Cesc Fàbregas as the latter took offense to Kanouté kicking the ball from the penalty spot after Messi had placed it to take the spot kick. After the match, Fàbregas was accused of racially abusing Kanouté, which the player vehemently denied and at the end both players apologized over the incident by telephone.

On 25 October, Barcelona traveled to Los Cármenes to take on Granada where they escaped with a 0–1 victory after a 33rd-minute goal from a free-kick by Xavi. Barça also lost forward Pedro for approximately three weeks due to strained tendons in his left ankle.

November
On 1 November, the 23-men shortlist for the 2011 FIFA Ballon d'Or was released with eight Barcelona—Eric Abidal, Dani Alves, Cesc Fàbregas, Andrés Iniesta, Lionel Messi, Gerard Piqué, David Villa and Xavi. Later that night, Barcelona defeated Viktoria Plzeň 0–4 in Prague at the Synot Tip Arena with a hat-trick by Messi and assured their progress into the knock-out stage. With the three goals, he surpassed the 200-goal mark as a Barcelona player in Pep Guardiola's 200th game as first team manager. Goalkeeper Víctor Valdés broke the team record for most minutes without conceding a goal at 877 consecutive minutes. He surpasses Miguel Reina record of 824 minutes set in the 1972–73 season.

On 9 November, the first leg of the Round of 16 of the Copa del Rey was moved up due to Barcelona's involvement in the 2011 FIFA Club World Cup in December. Barça won the match 0–1 with a strike outside the area by Andrés Iniesta in the 42nd minute.

On 22 November, assistant coach Tito Vilanova was successfully operated for problem in his parotid gland. The club did not release anymore information on the matter due to the coach's wish to have everything remain private. The next day, Barcelona defeated Milan at the San Siro 2–3 in a thrilling European encounter to win Group H.

On 26 November, Barça lost its first official match of the season with a 1–0 defeat at Getafe with a goal by Juan Valera in the 67th minute. The defeat leaves Barcelona 6 points behind Real Madrid with 2 matches to go for the first el Clásico of the season.

December
On 10 December, the first Clásico of the season was contested at the Bernabéu with Barça securing a 1–3 victory over their great rivals. Real Madrid's forward Karim Benzema scored the fastest goal in Clásico history after getting one past goalkeeper Víctor Valdés off two deflections 24 seconds into the match. Within 30 minutes, Barça equalized with a strike from Alexis followed by a goal by Fàbregas, making it three years running that their big summer transfers score in the first Clásico of the season.

On 15 December, David Villa fractured his tibia while attempting to score in Barça's 0–4 FIFA Club World Cup semi-final victory over Qatari club Al-Sadd. The injury will sideline the player for four-to-six months, possibly causing him to miss UEFA Euro 2012.

On 18 December, Barcelona claimed the Club World Cup with a 0–4 victory over Brazilian club Santos in Japan. A brace from Lionel Messi and strikes from Xavi and Fabregas gave Barça their fifth title in 2011 and their second title in this competition.

On 22 December, Barcelona defeated L'Hospitalet in the second leg of the Copa del Rey 9–0 (10–0 aggregate). Strikes from Pedro, Iniesta, Xavi, Thiago, Cristian Tello and Isaac Cuenca sealed what was another superb display of talent and command on the pitch by the Catalans. The latter three scored a brace each and the win helped the team proceed to the next round of the competition where they face Osasuna at Camp Nou in a first leg Round of 16 tie.

January
On 4 January, Barça started off the year with a 4–0 victory over Osasuna in their Round of 16 tie at the Camp Nou. Lionel Messi came off the bench to score two goals in the last 20 minutes after he was left off the team sheet earlier in the day due to the flu.

On 8 January, the derbi barceloní ended in a 1–1 draw with goals by Cesc Fàbregas (16th minute) for Barcelona and Álvaro Vázquez (86th minute) for Espanyol. Barcelona right back Dani Alves was racially abused by the Espanyol fans throughout the match and prompted the Espanyol coach Mauricio Pochettino to "condemn the actions of his fans."

On 9 January, Lionel Messi was awarded the 2011 FIFA Ballon d'Or and Pep Guardiola received the FIFA Coach of the Year award in Zürich. With the award, Messi wins his third consecutive Ballon d'Or, joining Michel Platini, Marco van Basten and Johan Cruyff as the only three-time winners, and the first since Platini to win it three consecutive years.

On 11 January, Barça and French club Paris Saint-Germain agreed to the transfer of Brazilian left back Maxwell for €4 million.

On 12 January, Barcelona defeated Osasuna 1–2 at the Reyno de Navarra to move on to the Copa del Rey quarter-finals where they'll meet Real Madrid for another round of Clásicos. CB Andreus Fontàs will miss the rest of the year when he suffered a torn ACL in the 14th minute of play. Pedro will also be sidelined for ten days due to a minor hamstring injury.

On 15 January, Barcelona defeated Real Betis 4–2 to remain five points back in second place in La Liga table. With the victory, Pep Guardiola notched his 100th win in the Primera División, only needing 132 matches to accomplish the feat.

On 18 January, Barça defeated Real Madrid at the Bernabéu in consecutive months, by a 1–2 scoreline. Goals by defenders Carles Puyol and Eric Abidal secured the comeback victory in the first leg. The match did not end without some controversy as Real Madrid's defender Pepe seemed to have stepped on Lionel Messi's hand while the latter was sitting on the ground. The player escaped without sanction from the referee even though the action was viewed by every camera angle at the stadium.

On 22 January, the postponed Week 1 match against Málaga due to the player's strike was played at La Rosadela with Barça taking a 1–4 victory. A Lionel Messi hat-trick provided all three points for Barcelona to keep pace on Real Madrid for the title.

On 25 January, Barcelona eliminated Real Madrid from the Copa del Rey with a 2–2 draw at Camp Nou to win the tie 4–3 on aggregate and reached their 50th semi-final all time in the competition.

On 29 January, Barça were held to a scoreless draw by Villarreal at the El Madrigal to put them seven points behind league leaders Real Madrid. Two days later, Isaac Cuenca extended his contract until 30 June 2015 and was officially promoted to the first-team.

February
On 8 February, Barcelona defeated Valencia 2–0 at Camp Nou and 3–1 on aggregate to advance to their 34th Copa del Rey final. Goals from Cesc Fàbregas and Xavi to set up a rematch of the 2009 final against Athletic Bilbao.

On 11 February, Barcelona suffered their second loss of the season, 3–2 to Osasuna in Pamplona. With the loss, the team continued to show their struggles in the league away from the Camp Nou, dropping ten points behind leaders Real Madrid.

On 14 February, Barcelona defeated Bayer Leverkusen at the BayArena with a 3–1 win in their Champions League first leg encounter to move closer to qualifying for the quarter-finals. Alexis Sánchez scored his first two goals in the Champions League in first start.

On 19 February, Barcelona notched their 15th win in La Liga against Valencia with a 5–1 scoreline at Camp Nou to keep pace with Real Madrid. Lionel Messi celebrated his 200th match in La Liga by scoring four goals.

On 26 February, Barcelona defeated Atlético Madrid with a 1–2 scoreline at the Vicente Calderón. Lionel Messi was booked in the eighth minute for a handball and will miss his first match in his career due to cards accumulation.

March
On 3 March, Barcelona defeated Sporting Gijón with a 3–1 score despite playing with ten men for more than half-an-hour after Gerard Piqué was sent off for throwing his boot at the Sporting de Gijón kit man at the start of the second half.

On 7 March, Barcelona defeated Bayer Leverkusen 7–1 with Lionel Messi becoming the first player to score five goals in a match in the Champions League era. Cristian Tello made a great debut in the competition by scoring his first two goals to complete the Barça rout.

On 11 March, Barcelona defeated Racing de Santander 0–2 in Cantabria to notch their 18th win in La Liga. The goals were scored by Lionel Messi to take his season total to 50 goals with more than two months left in the season.

On 15 March, Barcelona announced that defender Eric Abidal will have "a liver transplant as a result of the progress of his liver disease" and will miss the rest of the season. No further information was made available "at the express wish of the player, the club requested the utmost respect for the right to privacy and confidentiality".

On 17 March, Barcelona defeated Sevilla 0–2 at the Ramón Sánchez Pizjuán. The first goal was scored off a stunning freekick by Xavi in the 17th minute and the second by Messi in the 24th minute after a great display of team passing.

On 20 March, Barcelona beat Granada 5–3 at Camp Nou behind a historic hat-trick by Lionel Messi. Messi took his career tally to 234 goals as a Barcelona player and surpassed César as the all-time top scorer for the club in competitive matches.

On 28 March, Barcelona and Milan finished 0–0 at San Siro in their first leg quarter-finals encounter in the Champions League. The next day, Barça filed a complaint with UEFA over the state of the pitch after both clubs agreed it would be in suitable conditions to play. Guardiola said, "it is bad for the spectacle, but to be champions we must overcome all adversities. We have done this many times, although people say otherwise."

April
On 3 April, Barcelona advanced to its fifth consecutive Champions League semi-finals with a 3–1 victory (3–1 on aggregate) over Milan. Lionel Messi scored two penalties to take his season tally to 14 goals and set a new record in the Champions League era.

On 4 April, Barcelona announced that Barcelona B defender Marc Muniesa signed an extension to his contract and will be promoted to the first team for the 2012–13 season.

On 10 April, Barcelona defeated Getafe 4–0 at Camp Nou to sleep one point behind league leaders Real Madrid. The victory was dedicated to defender Eric Abidal who underwent a liver transplant, from players and coaches at the post-game press conference.

On 14 April, Barcelona came back to defeat Levante 1–2 at the Ciutat de València. Lionel Messi lead with a brace and took his tally to 41 goals in the league, that left him tied with Real Madrid's Cristiano Ronaldo for the league lead. They also surpassed the record of 40 goals in a season set by Cristiano Ronaldo last season.

On 18 April, Barcelona lost its first match in this season's Champions League, 1–0 to Chelsea at Stamford Bridge in London. Even though they dominated every aspect of the match, they were defeated at the stroke of half-time by the lone goal scored by Didier Drogba.

On 21 April, Barcelona lost their second game in row after being defeated at Camp Nou by fierce rival Real Madrid with a scoreline of 1–2 in El Clásico. Sami Khedira, Alexis Sánchez and Cristiano Ronaldo provided the goals.

On 24 April, Barcelona drew 2–2 with Chelsea in the 2nd leg semi-final of the Champions League at the Camp Nou. Sergio Busquets and Andrés Iniesta put Barcelona up 2–0 by the 44th minute as the Spanish club again dominated possession from the start, owning 73% for the game. In between those goals, Chelsea captain John Terry was given a straight red card for putting his knee into the back of Alexis Sánchez, as Barcelona seemed well on its way to reach a third final in four years making a Chelsea fightback look even more unlikely. But Ramires lobbed a shot right before half-time giving the advantage back to his team on aggregate, and the Spanish giants never found a way to recover after the break. After Lionel Messi blasted a penalty off the crossbar in the 59th minute and came close once again with another, Chelsea goalkeeper Petr Čech making a diving effort to slightly alter the ball's path to the post. Substitute Fernando Torres dribbled round Víctor Valdés to score in added time to make it 2–3 on aggregate and sealed Barcelona's elimination from Europe.

On 27 April, manager Pep Guardiola announced he would step down as coach at the end of the season. His record of 13 trophies in four seasons has made him the most successful coach in Barcelona's history. At the press conference in which Barcelona confirmed Guardiola's exit, the team also announced that he would be succeeded by current assistant Tito Vilanova. Vilanova will begin leading the first team at the start of the 2012–13 season.

May
On 2 May, Barcelona defeated Málaga 4–1 at the Camp Nou. Lionel Messi scored a hat-trick and took his season tally to 68 goals in all competitions, passing Gerd Müller's record of 67 goals in the 1972–73 season.

On 5 May, Barcelona took the second leg of the derbi barceloní with a 4–0 victory over Espanyol. Lionel Messi scored four times and became the first player in La Liga to score 50 goals in a season. It was also an emotional farewell match for Guardiola in his last home game as Barça's manager.

On 12 May, Barcelona drew their last league game of the season at the Benito Villamarín 2–2 against Real Betis. Barça finished 9 points off the league winner Real Madrid while Lionel Messi finished with 50 league goals to win the Pichichi Trophy and European Golden Boot as the league's top scorer and Víctor Valdés claimed the Zamora Trophy.

On 25 May, Barcelona claimed its 26th Copa del Rey with a 0–3 victory over Athletic Bilbao at the Vicente Calderón in Madrid. Pedro scored twice while Messi added the third in the seventh final contested between the two teams.

Players

Squad information

  

Total squad cost: €187.5M

From the youth system
Updated 13 August 2011

Transfers in

Total spending:  €60 million

Transfers out

Total income:  €21.75 million.

Expenditure:  €38.25 million

Club

Current technical staff

Statistics

Player statistics

Italic: denotes no longer with club.

Disciplinary record
Includes all competitive matches. The list is sorted by position, and then shirt number.

Italic: denotes no longer with club.

Pre-season and friendlies

Competitions

Supercopa de España

UEFA Super Cup

FIFA Club World Cup

La Liga

League table

Results by round

Matches

Copa del Rey

Kickoff times are in CET.

Round of 32

Round of 16

Quarter-finals

Semi-finals

Final

UEFA Champions League

Group stage

Knockout phase

Round of 16

Quarter-finals

Semi-finals

Copa Catalunya

References

Spanish football clubs 2011–12 season
2011-12
2011–12 in Catalan football
2011–12 UEFA Champions League participants seasons
2011-12